The 2022 Open de Oeiras was a professional tennis tournament played on clay courts. It was the fifth edition of the tournament which was part of the 2022 ATP Challenger Tour. It took place in Oeiras, Portugal between 28 March and 4 April 2022.

Singles main-draw entrants

Seeds

 1 Rankings are as of 21 March 2022.

Other entrants
The following players received wildcards into the singles main draw:
  Pedro Araújo
  Tiago Cação
  João Domingues

The following player received entry into the singles main draw as a special exempt:
  Daniel Michalski

The following players received entry into the singles main draw as alternates:
  Riccardo Bonadio
  Lukáš Rosol
  Andrea Vavassori

The following players received entry from the qualifying draw:
  Luciano Darderi
  Lucas Gerch
  Ergi Kırkın
  Matthieu Perchicot
  Noah Rubin
  Alex Rybakov

The following player received entry as a lucky loser:
  Francesco Forti

Champions

Singles

 Gastão Elias def.  Nino Serdarušić 6–3, 6–4.

Doubles

 Nuno Borges /  Francisco Cabral def.  Sanjar Fayziev /  Markos Kalovelonis 6–3, 6–0.

References

2022 ATP Challenger Tour
March 2022 sports events in Portugal
April 2022 sports events in Portugal
2022 in Portuguese sport